Ballabeg Station (Manx: Stashoon Raad Yiarn Valley Beg) is a rural intermediate request stop on the coastal route of the Manx Electric Railway on the Isle of Man with a small station house constructed in 1905.

Location
The station can be found between Onchan and Laxey on the island's eastern coast. It serves the small hamlet of Ballabeg; it is on the main coast road between Douglas and Ramsey.

Facilities
In 1905 a small hut (the "station house") was built here in typical style from corrugated iron with a pitched roof, and painted in standard green livery.  After some years of neglect this was restored by local residents from 2005 to 2008. It largely serves local traffic, being on the outskirts of the residential area of the village.

Namesake
This article refers to the Manx Electric Railway station, not to be confused with the Isle of Man Railway station in the south of the island; see Ballabeg Railway Station for details of this stopping place.

Route

Also
Manx Electric Railway Stations

References

Sources
 Manx Electric Railway Stopping Places (2002) Manx Electric Railway Society
 Island Images: Manx Electric Railway Pages (2003) Jon Wornham
 Official Tourist Department Page (2009) Isle Of Man Heritage Railways
 Ballabeg (2009) Isle of Man Steam Railway Supporters Association

Railway stations opened in 1894
Railway stations in the Isle of Man
Manx Electric Railway